Återtåget may refer to:

 1996 July-August tour in Sweden by Swedish pop group Gyllene Tider
 Återtåget Live!, 1997 album from Swedish pop group Gyllene Tider